Harry Glover Lee (February 22, 1877 in Waterloo, New York – March 10, 1937 in Los Angeles, California) was an American track and field athlete who competed at the 1900 Summer Olympics in Paris, France.

Lee competed in the 400 metres. He finished tied for fourth place overall. After taking second place in his first round semifinal heat, Lee (along with two of the four other Americans who had qualified for the final) refused to take part in the final because it was held on a Sunday.

References

External links 

 De Wael, Herman. Herman's Full Olympians: "Athletics 1900". Accessed 18 March 2006.
 

1877 births
1937 deaths
Athletes (track and field) at the 1900 Summer Olympics
Olympic track and field athletes of the United States
American male sprinters
Syracuse Orange athletes
People from Waterloo, New York
Sportspeople from New York (state)